was a village located in Minamishitara District, Aichi Prefecture, Japan.

Geography
Tsukude was located in east-central of Aichi Prefecture. Some 90 percent of the village area was covered in mountains and forest, and most was within the borders of the Aichi Kōgen Quasi-National Park

History
Tsukude was home to the Okudaira clan during the Sengoku period, and to the short-lived Tsukude Domain under the Tokugawa Shogunate of the Edo period.

Modern Tsukude village was created through the merger of nine small hamlets on May 1, 1906.

On October 1, 2005, Tsukude, along with the town of Hōrai (also from Minamishitara District), was merged into the expanded city of Shinshiro and has ceased to exist as an independent municipality.

Dissolved municipalities of Aichi Prefecture
Shinshiro, Aichi